The 2022–23 Úrvalsdeild karla is the 72nd season of the Úrvalsdeild karla, the top tier men's basketball league in Iceland. It started on 6 October 2022.

Competition format
The participating teams first played a conventional round-robin schedule with every team playing each opponent once home and once away for a total of 22 games. The top eight teams qualified for the championship playoffs whilst the two last qualified were relegated to 1. deild karla.

Teams

Managerial changes

Notable incidents
On 30 April, Dominykas Milka confirmed that Keflavík would not be offering him a contract after three seasons and one trip to the Úrvalsdeild finals.
On 2 May, Dagur Kár Jónsson returned to the Úrvalsdeild after playing in Spain and signed with KR.
On 10 May, Höttur signed Montenegrin center Nemanja Knezevic who had played the previous five seasons with Vestri and led the Úrvalsdeild in rebounding during the 2021–22 season.
On 12 May, Haukar signed Hilmar Smári Henningsson from Stjarnan and Breki Gylfason from ÍR, both of whom came up through Haukar's junior programs.
On 21 May, it was reported that Ágúst Orrason, who had played the previous seven seasons with Keflavík was retiring from top-level basketball.
On 21 May, Haukar signed Daniel Mortensen, the reigning Úrvalsdeild Foreign Player of the Year, who played the previous season with Þór Þorlákshöfn.
On 6 June, Þór Þorlákshöfn signed Fotios Lampropoulos who helped Njarðvík to the best record in the league the previous season.
On 10 June, the 2021 Úrvalsdeild Playoffs MVP, Adomas Drungilas, signed with Tindastóll after playing for Tartu Ülikool in the Latvian-Estonian Basketball League the previous season.
On 17 July, Höttur signed American-Hungarian point guard Obie Trotter.
On 25 July, Breiðablik signed 1. deild karla assists leader Clayton Ladine from Hrunamenn.
On 3 August, Haukar signed Lithuanian forward Norbertas Giga.
On 16 August, Njarðvík signed former Iran national team player Philip Jalalpoor.
On 16 August, Grindavík signed former Greek Basket League champion Gaios Skordilis.
On 27 August, Brynjar Þór Björnsson announced his retirement from top-tier basketball.
On 5 October, Pavel Ermolinskij announced his retirement from playing.
On 13 October, Njarðvík released former Iran national team player Philip Jalalpoor after appearing in one game for the club.
On 14 October, Valur signed back Callum Lawson who had initially signed with JA Vichy after winning the national title with Valur in 2022.
On 14 October, Styrmir Snær Þrastarson joined Þór Þorlákshöfn after starting the season with Davidson College.
On 18 October, KR signed Philip Jalalpoor who started the season with Njarðvík.
On 19 October, Njarðvík announced that it had signed Nicolás Richotti to fill the spot left by the release of Philip Jalalpoor. Richotti spent the 2021–22 season with Njarðvík, where he averaged 14.4 points, 4.4 rebounds and 5.2 assists.
On 19 October, Grindavík announced it had signed Icelandic national team member Jón Axel Guðmundsson.
On 21 October, KR signed E. C. Matthews to replace Michael Mallory.
On 1 November, it was reported that Vangelis Tzolos had left Grindavík after appearing in four games where he averaged 8.3 points and 2.3 rebounds.
On 15 November, Njarðvík announced it had signed former Spanish national team member Nacho Martín.
On 17 November, Grindavík signed former Úrvalsdeild scoring leader Damier Pitts.
On 21 November, Þór Þorlákshöfn's Vincent Malik Shahid set a new Úrvalsdeild single game assist record when he handed out 19 assists in a victory against Keflavík, breaking David Edwards record of 18 assists set on 8 December 1996.
On 14 December, KR signed Ireland national team member Brian Fitzpatrick.
On 15 December, KR released Roberts Freimanis after he averaged 8.6 points, 6.3 rebounds and 1.6 assists in nine games.
On 29 December, Logi Gunnarsson became the oldest player to score 20 points in an Úrvalsdeild karla game when he scored 23 points for Njarðvík in a victory against Keflavík, breaking Alexander Ermolinskij's record from 2001.
On 30 December, Stjarnan announced that Julius Jucikas and Robert Turner, the leagues second leading scorer, where leaving the team. Jucikas was released by the club but Turner was bought by 
On 2 January, it was reported that KR had released Jor­d­an Semple and would release E.C. Matthews following its game against Grindavík on 5 January. The same day it was announced the team had signed Justas Tamul­is.
On 5 January, KR announced it had reached an agreement with Dagur Kár Jónsson to release him from his contract so he could sign with Stjarnan.
On 6 January, KR signed Antonio Williams, their 10th foreign player of the season.
On 24 January, Zoran Vrkić was released by the Tindastóll after averaging 7.7 points and 4.1 rebounds. Three days later, he signed with rival Úrvalsdeild club Grindavík.
On 26 January, Höttur signed former Dutch national team member Bryan Alberts. He had previously played for Höttur in 2021.
On 9 March, KR was officially relegated to the second-tier 1. deild karla for the first time in its history.

Clubs in European competitions

References

External links
Official Icelandic Basketball Association website
Season info on Icelandic Basketball Association

Icelandic
Lea
Úrvalsdeild karla (basketball)
Iceland